Caloparyphus tetraspilus is a species of soldier fly in the family Stratiomyidae.

Distribution
Canada, United States.

References

Stratiomyidae
Insects described in 1866
Diptera of North America
Taxa named by Hermann Loew